Caher Mountain ( = "stone ring-fort") is a hill, 338 metres high, with views of the Sheep's Head peninsula, roughly west of and above the village of Kilcrohane in County Cork, Ireland.

Location 
Caher Mountain is located approximately 15 km from the end of the Sheep's Head peninsula and around 4 km west of Kilcrohane. Its neighbouring summit is Seefin (345 m), some 5 km to the northeast. It is at grid reference V793380 and can be reached on an easy walk from a lay-by about 1.5 km above the village.

Views 
In clear weather there are views as far as Dursey Island and the Iveragh Peninsula from Caher Mountain.

References 

Mountains and hills of County Cork